The 2012 1000 Guineas Stakes was a horse race held at Newmarket Racecourse on Sunday 6 May 2012. It was the 199th running of the 1000 Guineas.

The winner was Susan Magnier, Michael Tabor and Derrick Smith's Homecoming Queen, a three-year-old bay filly trained at Ballydoyle in Ireland by Aidan O'Brien and ridden by Ryan Moore. Homecoming Queen's victory was the first in the race for Moore, and the second for O'Brien after Virginia Waters (also owned by Magnier and Tabor) in 2005. Her nine length margin of victory was the widest since 1859.

The contenders
The race attracted a field of seventeen runners, eleven trained in the United Kingdom, five in Ireland and one in France. The favourite was the Aidan O'Brien-trained Maybe, the European Champion Two-Year-Old Filly of 2011 whose wins included the Group One Moyglare Stud Stakes. She was accompanied by her stable companion Homecoming Queen, who had won three of her thirteen races, most notably the Leopardstown 1,000 Guineas Trial Stakes. The Godolphin stable was represented by the undefeated pair Lyric of Light (Fillies' Mile) and Discourse (Sweet Solera Stakes). The French challenger was Mashoora, the winner of the Prix Imprudence at Maisons-Laffitte on her most recent start. Other contenders included the Fred Darling Stakes winner Moonstone Magic and the Cheveley Park Stakes winner Lightening Pearl. Maybe headed the betting at odds of 13/8 ahead of Mashoora and Moonstone Magic (13/2), Lyric of Light (8/1) and Discourse (10/1). Homecoming Queen started a 25/1 outsider.

The race
The start of the race was considerably delayed after Gray Pearl collapsed in the starting stalls, sustaining a fatal spinal injury. Homecoming Queen, the last filly to enter the stalls, broke very quickly and immediately took the lead from Alla Speranza, Lightening Pearl and Nayarra. After splitting into two groups across the wide, straight course, in the first quarter mile the field reunited and raced down the centre of the track. The order was maintained until three furlongs from the finish, at which point Ryan Moore increased the pace on Homecoming Queen and opened up a clear advantage. The Ballydoyle outsider never looked in any danger of defeat despite drifting to the right in the closing stages and steadily increased her lead to win by nine lengths. Another outsider, Starscope, chased her in vain throughout the final furlong and took second place by a length ahead of Maybe and The Fugue. None of the other fancied runners ever posed a threat, with Mashoora finishing twelfth, Moonstone Magic fifteenth, Discourse sixteenth and Lyric of Light seventeenth and last.

Lyric of Light, was subsequently disqualified after a post-race urine sample revealed traces of Propoxyphene, a prohibited analgesic substance.

Race details
 Sponsor: QIPCO
 First prize: £213,513
 Surface: Turf
 Going: Good to Soft
 Distance: 8 furlongs
 Number of runners: 17
 Winner's time: 1:40.45

Full result

 Abbreviations: nse = nose; nk = neck; shd = head; hd = head; dist = distance; UR = unseated rider; DSQ = disqualified

Winner's details
Further details of the winner, Homecoming Queen
 Foaled: 23 April 2009
 Country: Ireland
 Sire: Holy Roman Emperor; Dam: Lagrion (Diesis)
 Owner: Susan Magnier, Michael Tabor and Derrick Smith
 Breeder: Tower Bloodstock

References

2012 in horse racing
 2012
1000 Guineas
1000 Guineas
2010s in Suffolk